Alimami Gory (born 30 August 1996) is a French professional footballer who plays as a striker for Ligue 2 club Paris FC.

Club career
Gory is a youth exponent from Le Havre AC. He made his first team debut on 12 August 2016 against Gazélec Ajaccio replacing Ghislain Gimbert after 70 minutes.

On 1 September 2021, he joined Paris FC on loan with an option to buy. On 9 July 2022, Gory returned to Paris FC on a permanent basis and signed a two-year contract.

International career
Born in France, Gory is of Malian descent. In October 2018 he received his first call-up to the Mali senior national team.

References

1996 births
Living people
French footballers
French sportspeople of Malian descent
Association football forwards
Ligue 2 players
Belgian Pro League players
Le Havre AC players
Cercle Brugge K.S.V. players
ES Troyes AC players
Paris FC players
French expatriate footballers
French expatriate sportspeople in Belgium
Expatriate footballers in Belgium
Footballers from Le Havre